Charlie Curtis (17 December 1878 – 8 May 1959) was an Australian rules footballer who played with Carlton in the Victorian Football League (VFL).

Family
The son of John Richard Curtis, J.P. (1853-1945), and Elizabeth Curtis (1855-1931), née Harry, Charles Ernest Curtis was born at Carlton, Victoria on 17 December 1878.

One of his brothers, Harry Richard Curtis (1892-1968), played VFL football for both Carlton and Collingwood.

He married Alice Louisa Atkinson (1882-1906) in 1904. He married Maud May Ratcliff (1887-1948) in 1911.

Death
He died at St Vincent's Hospital in Fitzroy, Victoria on 8 May 1959.

Notes

References
 
 Foreman Robs Employer, The Herald, (Tuesday, 18 September 1923), p.16.
 Skins Stolen from Tannery: Foreman Sent to Gaol, The Argus, (Wednesday, 19 September 1923), p.7.
 Employe Sent to Gaol: Tempering Justice with Mercy, The Age, (Wednesday, 19 September 1923), p.15.

External links 

 	
 	
 Charles Curtis, at The VFA Project
 Charlie Curtis's profile at Blueseum

1878 births
1959 deaths
Australian rules footballers from Melbourne
Carlton Football Club players
People from Carlton, Victoria